NHS National Services Scotland (NSS) is a Non Departmental Public Body which provides advice and services to the rest of NHS Scotland.

Accountable to the Scottish Government, NSS works at the heart of the health service, providing national strategic support services and expert advice to NHS Scotland. It also plays an active and crucial role in the delivery of effective healthcare to patients and the public.

This supporting role to NHS Scotland means the organisation works closely with other NHS organisations, especially NHS Boards, in the delivery of services. Health Support services enable NHS Boards to focus on delivering health improvement and patient care. Business Support services help NHS Boards to operate more efficiently and effectively. National Services Scotland (NSS) is the common name for the Common Services Agency for NHS Scotland.

NSS employs around 3,600 highly specialised staff based at locations in Edinburgh, Glasgow, Aberdeen, Inverness, Dundee and Livingston.

Services was organised into six Strategic Business Units in 2013/2014, after previously being made up of a number of divisions:

On 1 April 2020 the Public Health and Intelligence business unit was transferred to Public Health Scotland.

Scottish National Blood Transfusion Service
Scottish National Blood Transfusion Service - Blood transfusion services

Central Legal Services
Central Legal Office - Specialist legal services

Information Technology Services
National Information Systems Group - Supports the delivery of Information Management & Technology (IM&T).

The Scottish Wide Area Network is a single public services network available for public service organisations within Scotland. NSS have a central role in creating this.

In September 2014 Storm ID were appointed for a 4-year term to provide the framework for IT Specialist Services.

In January 2019 it was announced that a deal had been concluded with Microsoft to  use Office 365 and Windows 10 for the National Digital Platform which is to join 100 different computer systems and be used by 161,000 employees using a single sign-on across Scotland.

Practitioner and Counter Fraud Services
Practitioner Services - Family health service payments and patient registration
Scottish Dental Practice Board
Counter Fraud Services - Deterring, detecting and investigating fraud
Scottish Health Service Centre - Conference facilities and event organising

Procurement, Commissioning and Facilities Services
National Procurement - Acquiring, storing and delivering goods and services.  It operates a fleet of trucks which are based at the National Distribution Centre at Canderside in Lanarkshire. In 2009 the 28 trucks made around 15,000 deliveries to hospitals across Scotland. The contracts that National Procurement has in place were worth £700 million.
NHS Scotland Assure - Formerly Health Facilities Scotland, NHSS Assure was launched in June 2021 as a reformed service to oversee healthcare construction in Scotland. The service provides operational advice on all facilities topics.  It runs a health and care construction framework, where six leading construction firms are Principal Supply Chain Partners.
National Services Division - NSD are responsible for screening and specialist health services across Scotland and commission over 85 designated specialist services on behalf of the Scottish Government and NHS Scotland's territorial health boards.

References

External links

NHS Scotland
Public bodies of the Scottish Government
Organisations based in Edinburgh